Dithionic acid, H2S2O6, is a chemical compound known only in solution.

Salts 

Dithionic acid is diprotic and salts called dithionates are known. No acid salts (i.e.: one proton lost) have been discovered. All dithionates are readily soluble in water. They are mild oxidizing and mild reducing agents. The shape of the dithionate ion is like ethane, but two SO3 groups adopt an almost eclipsed conformation. The S—S bond length is about 2.15 Å; the S—O bonds are rather short with a bond length of 1.43 Å.

Synthesis 
Dithionates can be made by oxidizing a sulfite (from the +4 to the +5 oxidation state), but on a larger scale they are made by oxidizing a cooled aqueous solution of sulfur dioxide with manganese dioxide:

2 MnO2 + 3 SO2 → MnS2O6 + MnSO4

The manganese dithionate solution formed can then be converted to dithionate salts of other metals by metathesis reactions:

Ba2+() + MnS2O6() + MnSO4() → BaSO4()↓ + BaS2O6·2H2O()

Concentrated solutions of dithionic acid can subsequently be obtained treating a barium dithionate solution with sulfuric acid:

BaS2O6() + H2SO4() → H2S2O6() + BaSO4()↓

See also 
Hypophosphoric acid, the phosphorus equivalent.

References 

www.chemindustry.com/chemicals/1022920.html - CASNo reference

Dithionates
Sulfur oxoacids
Oxoacids